The Federal Plant Pest Act of 1957 (P.L. 85-36) prohibited the movement of pests from a foreign country into or through the United States unless authorized by United States Department of Agriculture (USDA).

It was superseded by the Plant Protection Act of 2000 (P.L. 106-224, Title IV). Under the new law, the Animal and Plant Health Inspection Service (APHIS) retains broad authority to inspect, seize, quarantine, treat, destroy or dispose of imported plant and animal materials that are potentially harmful to U.S. agriculture, horticulture, forestry, and, to a certain degree, natural resources. (7 U.S.C. 7701 et seq.).

Titles of the Act
The 1957 Act was drafted as two titles defining policy standards for the control, eradication, and regulation of plant pests.

Title I - Federal Plant Pest Act - 7 U.S.C. §§ 150aa-150jj
Definitions
Dissemination of plant pests
Postal laws
Seizure of infected plants
Regulations and conditions
Inspections and seizures
Penalty
Separability
Disinfection of railway cars
Repeals

Title II - Eradication and Control of Insect Pests, Plant Diseases, and Nematodes - 7 U.S.C. § 147a
Department of Agriculture Organic Act of 1944 amendment

References

1957 in law
1957 in American law
85th United States Congress
United States Department of Agriculture
United States federal agriculture legislation
Pest legislation